Forest Baskett (born May 11, 1943) is an American venture capitalist, computer scientist and former professor of electrical engineering at Stanford University.

He is a venture capitalist at New Enterprise Associates. Baskett designed the operating system for the original Cray-1 super-computer and was an original pioneer of Very Large Scale Integration.

Baskett received a BA in Mathematics from Rice University, a Ph.D. in Computer Science from the University of Texas at Austin.

He became a member of the National Academy of Engineering in 1994 for his vision and leadership in the development of hardware and software for high-performance workstations.

Baskett was the doctoral advisor of computer scientist Andy Bechtolsheim while at Stanford, and was involved in the founding of Sun Microsystems.

References 

American computer scientists
Rice University alumni
University of Texas at Austin College of Natural Sciences alumni
Living people
American venture capitalists
1943 births